Surprise Package was a 1960s rock band, recording on Columbia Records.  They consisted of Greg Beck (guitar, backing vocals), Kim Eggers (lead vocals & Sax), Michael Rogers (piano, organ, bass, backing vocals), and Fred Zeufeldt (drums, backing vocals). They had several hits, including The Other Me, written by Jimmy Griffin and Michael Z. Gordon (1967).

The Surprise Package was one of the top 60's Northwest contemporary rock bands from the greater Seattle area. They were originally called the Viceroys, and had a Northwest instrumental hit called Granny's Pad. The band consisted of Greg Beck (guitar, vocals), Kim Eggers (lead vocals & Sax), Michael Rogers (piano, organ, bass, vocals) and Fred Zeufeldt (drums, vocals). In 1966 after doing some Dick Clark Where the Action Is tours and shows with their friends Paul Revere and the Raiders, they recorded some songs on Columbia Records, produced by Jerry Fuller. During a mixdown session, Lou Adler (the Mamas and Papas producer) suggested the name 'The Surprise Package' to replace the dated 'Viceroys' handle. They recorded four songs under Fuller's production: Eastside, Westside, Going Out of My Mind, The Merry Go Round, and The Other Me, written by Jimmy Griffin and Michael Z. Gordon in 1967. Unfortunately, Columbia apparently had too many artists to market, so The Surprise Package got very little promotion. In late 1967, Kim Eggers left the band and singer Rob Lowrey was hired to replace him. In 1968 they recorded an album called Free Up for Lee Hazlewood's LHI-label, which spun off two singles as well: the title track and their version of MacArthur Park in 1969. In 1970, Mike Rogers left the band, they then added Gene Hubbard on keys and became American Eagle.

References
 USA single's list A-Z from 1966-72
 Lost Jukebox
 Surprise Package, Vinyl Records
 Surprise Package: The Collector's Edition
 The Surprise Package on Discogs

Rock music groups from Washington (state)
Musical groups from Seattle
Columbia Records artists